The 2021–22 Japan Figure Skating Championships were held in Saitama, Saitama on December 22–26, 2021. It was the 90th edition of the event. Medals were awarded in the disciplines of men's singles, women's singles, pairs, and ice dance. The results were part of the Japanese selection criteria for the 2022 Four Continents Championships, the 2022 Winter Olympics, and the 2022 World Championships.

Qualifying 
Competitors either qualified at regional and sectional competitions, held from September to November 2021, or earned a bye.

Medal summary

Senior

Junior

Novice

Entries 
A list of preliminary entries was published on December 4, 2021. Names with an asterisk (*) denote junior skaters.

Junior 
The top six finishers at the Japan Junior Championships in men's and women's singles were added to the Japan Championships. The women's junior national champion, Mao Shimada, was a novice skater and therefore not eligible for the senior Championships. The seventh-place finisher, Ami Nakai, was bumped up in Shimada's place.

Changes to preliminary entries

Results

Men

Women

Pairs

Ice dance

Japan Junior Figure Skating Championships 
The 2021–22 Japan Junior Figure Skating Championships were held in Nagoya, Aichi from November 19–21, 2021. The national champions in men's and women's singles earned automatic berths on the 2022 World Junior Championships team. Top finishers in men's and women's singles were invited to compete at the senior Japan Championships in December.

Entries 
A list of preliminary entries was published on November 13, 2021. No pairs were entered. Names with an asterisk (*) denote novice skaters.

Novice 
Top finishers at the Japan Novice Championships in men's and women's singles were added to the Japan Junior Championships.

Results

Junior men

Junior women

Junior ice dance

International team selections

Four Continents Championships 
The 2022 Four Continents Championships were held in Tallinn, Estonia from January 18–23, 2022.

Winter Olympics 
The 2022 Winter Olympics were held in Beijing, China from February 4–20, 2022.

World Junior Championships 
Commonly referred to as "Junior Worlds", the 2022 World Junior Championships will be held in Tallinn, Estonia from April 13-17, 2022.

World Championships 
The 2022 World Championships were held in Montpellier, France from March 21–27, 2022.

References 

Japan Figure Skating Championships
Japan Championships
Figure Skating Championships